Jan Mucha (16 May 1941 – 15 May 2014) was an international motorcycle speedway rider who appeared in the Speedway World Championship finals four times. He was born in Mikołów, Poland.

World Final appearances

Individual World Championship
 1969 -  London, Wembley Stadium -  10th - 7pts
 1970 -  Wroclaw, Olympic Stadium -  11th - 6pts
 1973 -  Chorzów, Silesian Stadium - 9th - 7pts
 1977 -  Göteborg, Ullevi - 16th - 1pt

World Team Cup
 1970 -  London, Wembley Stadium (with Antoni Woryna / Paweł Waloszek / Edmund Migoś / Henryk Glücklich) - 3rd - 20pts (6)
 1974 -  Chorzów, Silesian Stadium (with Zenon Plech / Andrzej Jurczynski / Andrzej Tkocz / Jerzy Szczakiel) - 3rd - 13pt (4)

References 

1941 births
2014 deaths
Polish speedway riders
People from Mikołów
Sportspeople from Silesian Voivodeship